Shailene Garnett is a Canadian actress and filmmaker. She is known for starring in a variety of television series, including the CBC Television series Diggstown (2019–2022) and Murdoch Mysteries (2018–present), the Freeform series Shadowhunters (2016), and the Netflix series Between (2015). 

Throughout her career, Garnett has also appeared in the feature films The Dirties and Best Man Holiday (both 2013), and the web series Out with Dad (2011–2012) and Teenagers (2015–2017).

Early life 
Born and raised in Montreal, Quebec, Garnett worked in an elementary school as a teacher's assistant prior to beginning her career as an actress in Toronto.

Career 
Garnett began acting in the early 2010s when she moved to Toronto, with supporting and guest roles in various short films, web series, and television productions. In an interview, she said that the Olsen twins inspired her to pursue acting from a young age.

In 2013, Garnett portrayed Krissy B. in Matt Johnson's film The Dirties; this marked her first feature film role. That year, Garnett also appeared in the comedy drama film Best Man Holiday.

In 2015, she achieved wider recognition with her role in the Netflix series Between, in which she played Ms. Symonds. The following the year, she played Maureen for one season of the Freeform series Shadowhunters. From 2015 to 2017, she portrayed Adele on the Canadian web series Teenagers.

Garnett wrote, directed, produced, and starred in a short film titled 77 Days, which screened at several film festivals throughout 2017, including the Reelworld Film Festival. In an interview, Garnett said the film was inspired by a family member's struggle with addiction.

Since 2018, she has played the recurring role of Nomi Johnston on the long-running CBC Television series Murdoch Mysteries. 

From 2019 to 2022, Garnett has portrayed Iris Beals in Diggstown.

Filmography

References

External links 
 

Living people
Actresses from Montreal
Canadian film actresses
Canadian television actresses
Canadian women screenwriters
Writers from Montreal
Year of birth missing (living people)
Black Canadian actresses